Fabyan may refer to:

People
 George Fabyan (1867–1936), businessman and founder of a cryptology research laboratory
 Robert Fabyan (died c. 1512), English chronicler

Locations
 Fabyan, Alberta, a hamlet in Canada
 Fabyan House, a former hotel in New Hampshire
 Fabyan Windmill, in Geneva, Illinois
 Fabyan, Connecticut, a village